Royd E. Chambers (born June 28, 1961, in Adair County, Iowa) was the Iowa State Representative from the 5th District.  He served in the Iowa House of Representatives from 2003 through 2013.

Chambers served on several committees in the Iowa House – the Appropriations committee; the Education committee; the Labor committee; and the Veterans Affairs committee.  He also served as ranking member of the Education Appropriations Subcommittee.

Chambers was re-elected in 2006 with 7,736 votes, running unopposed.

Education
Chambers graduated from Bridgewater-Fontanelle High School. He obtained his B.A. from Buena Vista University.

Organizations
Chambers is a member of the following organizations:
 Iowa Air National Guard
 Sheldon Christian Retirement Home Board of Directors
 O'Brien County Farm Bureau
 Iowa Pork Producers
 O'Brien County Sportsman Club
 Osceola County Sportsman Club
 Clay County Pheasants Forever
 National Muzzle Loading Rifle Association
 National Field Archery Association
 National Wild Turkey Federation
 National Rifle Association
 Sheldon American Legion Post #145
 Sheldon United Methodist Church

Family
Chambers is married to his wife Barb and together they have a son, Jacob, and a daughter, Sarah.

References

External links
 Representative Royd E. Chambers official Iowa General Assembly site
 
 Financial information (state office) at the National Institute for Money in State Politics
 Profile at Iowa House Republicans

1961 births
Living people
People from Sheldon, Iowa
Buena Vista University alumni
Republican Party members of the Iowa House of Representatives